Marionettes of the Princess is a 1924 German silent drama film directed by Frederic Zelnik and starring Gertrude Welcker, Rudolf Forster and Erich Kaiser-Titz.

Cast
Gertrude Welcker
Rudolf Forster
Erich Kaiser-Titz
Maria Forescu
Anton Pointner
Frederic Zelnik

References

External links

Films of the Weimar Republic
German silent feature films
Films directed by Frederic Zelnik
German black-and-white films
1924 drama films
German drama films
Silent drama films
1920s German films